Pithalai Patty is a village located in Dindigul district, Tamil Nadu, India. It is at a distance of 5 km from Dindigul city.

The economy of the village is based on Textile industry and agriculture.
The source of agriculture in the village is Kudaganaru.  

When the Kadaganaru dam of the village overflows it seems a beautiful waterfall. People enjoy and the place become a picnic spot.

External links
Central Excise and Service Tax Location Code Government of India

Villages in Dindigul district